Kosmos 1867 is a nuclear powered radar ocean reconnaissance satellite (RORSAT) that was launched by the Soviet Union on July 10, 1987. Its mission was to monitor the oceans for naval and merchant vessels, and had a mission life of about eleven months.

Description
Kosmos 1867 was launched on July 10, 1987, on a Tsyklon-2 rocket from the Baikonur Cosmodrome. The satellite had a mission life of about 11 months.

The satellite was powered by TOPAZ 1 nuclear reactor. This reactor was cooled by liquid sodium-potassium (NaK) metal, and used a high-temperature moderator containing hydrogen and highly enriched fuel. The reactor produced electricity using a thermionic converter. The satellite used a Plazma-2 SPT Hall-effect thruster for propulsion.

The mission of Kosmos 1867 was to search the oceans for naval and merchant vessels. Unlike earlier Soviet RORSAT satellites, Kosmos 1867 and its twin, Kosmos 1818, were launched into high orbits. This reduced the likelihood of mishaps resulting in uncontrolled re-entry of radioactive material, as had occurred with Kosmos 954 and Kosmos 1402, which showered the Earth with radioactive debris.

In 1992, Kosmos 1867 had a visual magnitude of approximately 3.3.

Kosmos 1867 had become damaged, resulting in several fragments of space debris. It is suspected that the coolant tube had leaked NaK metal, in a manner similar to Kosmos 1818 in 2008. On April 8, 2014, the US Space Surveillance Network reported that 11 new objects were detected, and 24 more objects ware reported on April 15, 2014. The coolant tube of Kosmos 1867 may have cracked due to thermal stresses by repeated solar heating, or by an impact.

References

Reconnaissance satellites of the Soviet Union
Kosmos satellites
Nuclear power in space
1987 in the Soviet Union
Spacecraft launched in 1987